Eric Roberts (born 1956) is an American actor

Eric Roberts may also refer to:

Eric Roberts (bishop) (1914–1997), Welsh bishop
Eric S. Roberts, computer scientist
Eric Roberts (spy) (1907–1972), British MI5 agent
Eric Roberts (politician), member of the Oklahoma House of Representatives
 Eric Roberts (1910–1982), British comics artist, best known for his work for The Dandy and The Beano, such as Winker Watson.
Eric Roberts, musician with Gym Class Heroes